Jennifer Zeng (born October 19, 1966) is a Chinese-born human rights activist and author, best known for her practice of Falun Gong, the subsequent government suppression of the movement, and the book she wrote about her experience regarding Falun Gong: Witnessing History: One Chinese Woman's Fight for Freedom and Falun Gong.

Falun Gong
She became a practitioner of Falun Gong in 1997. Later, when the government of the People's Republic of China began to arrest people involved with the group, she was among them. She was in fact arrested four times, and sent to a labor camp, the Beijing Municipal Women's Re-Education-Through-Labor Camp. Zeng relates that at the camp she was physically and mentally abused, subject to attempted brainwashing and even faced electroshock treatment.

Asylum and activism
In 2001, she fled to Australia. Her daughter later followed her there for her own safety. Since arriving in Australia, she has spoken out about the Australian government's lack of protection of practitioners there, alleging that the government does not wish to insult or anger Mainland China. A specific instance which she recounted to the Australian Broadcasting Corporation involves how an official of the Mainland Chinese government once walked out of the Chinese embassy in Canberra and slapped a female Falun Gong practitioner on the face. The women responded that, in Australia, she had the right to be there and to continue practicing Falun Gong. The official responded saying that he was a Chinese diplomat. As such, no one particularly cared what he did, because Australia could not do much to him.

She published her book Witnessing History in 2005. The book describes the difficulties she has faced in practicing Falun Gong in Mainland China, and even since she left Mainland China. The book has been described by a reviewer in the Midwest Book Review as "a necessarily harsh assault on a nation that does not respect human rights", and by June Sawyers in Booklist as "an often harrowing, powerful reminder of what can happen when government power runs unchecked".

She currently lives in the US, where she has resided since 2011.

References

External links
Speech delivered at Free Speech Society, Copenhagen, Denmark, November 4, 2007

1966 births
Living people
Australian autobiographers
Chinese emigrants to Australia
Chinese human rights activists
Chinese prisoners and detainees
Chinese refugees
Falun Gong practitioners
Peking University alumni
Writers from Sydney
Prisoners and detainees of the People's Republic of China
Writers from Sichuan
People's Republic of China emigrants to the United States